Birgitte Cornelia Rojahn (18  February 1839 - 20  April 1927)  was a Norwegian stage actress, concert singer and voice trainer.  

She was the daughter of Ole Gulbrandsen Spor and wife Ingeborg Olsdatter England, and grew up at Smørsalmenningen in Bergen where her father ran his own beer brewery. She was the  sister of stage actress Louise  Brun  (1830–1866), wife of actor Johannes Brun (1832–1890).
Birgitte Cornelia Rojahn was engaged at the Det norske Theater (Bergen) in 1854-1857, was active as a concert singer in 1857-59, and as a singing instructor from 1859. In 1859, she was married to  Ferdinand August Rojahn, who came from Braunschweig, Germany. They were the parents of six children.

References

Other sources
 Jensson, Liv 1981: Biografisk skuespillerleksikon. Norske, danske og svenske skuespillere på norske scener særlig på 1800-tallet. Oslo: Universitetsforlaget. .

1839 births
1927 deaths
Actors from Bergen
19th-century Norwegian actresses
19th-century Norwegian women singers
Musicians from Bergen